WARC (90.3 FM) is a student-run, non-commercial, Federal Communications Commission-registered college radio station owned and operated by Allegheny College in Meadville, Pennsylvania, United States.

The WARC studio is located on the main floor of the Henderson Campus Center, located on the campus of Allegheny College. On October 3, 2014, WARC began broadcasting streaming online.

References

External links
 
 
 

ARC
ARC
Radio stations established in 1963